French Federation of Taekwondo and Related Disciplines (  is an association "law of 1901" which aims to organize on the French territory the practice of taekwondo, hapkido, tang soo do and Soo Bahk Do since 1995.

It is affiliated with European federations and organizations (European Taekwondo Union and All Europe Taekwon-do Federation) and World Taekwondo and International Taekwon-Do Federation governing taekwondo and its associated disciplines.

History
Created in 1995, the FFTDA succeeded the CNT (national taekwondo committee).

In 2012, it has 48,458 members.

References

External links
Official site

Sports organizations established in 1995
Taekwondo organizations
Organizations based in Paris
Taekwondo
1995 establishments in France
Taekwondo in France
National members of World Taekwondo
Hapkido organizations
National Taekwondo teams